Nash Community College is a public community college in Nash County, North Carolina. It is part of the North Carolina Community College System.

External links

References

Two-year colleges in the United States
Universities and colleges accredited by the Southern Association of Colleges and Schools
Education in Nash County, North Carolina
Buildings and structures in Nash County, North Carolina
North Carolina Community College System colleges